Counterstimulation is a treatment for pain based on distraction.

A basic example is the practice of rubbing a fresh bruise, so that attention is paid to the sense of touch and pressure, rather than to the pain of the injury. Liniment and "medicated" products containing menthol work in the same way, producing sensations such as heat or cold or strong odors.

Counterstimulation can also be applied to a remote part of the body.

Pain control can also be achieved by the use of electronic media, such as television or virtual reality.

See also
 Counterirritant

References

 A definition of counterstimulation
 Virtual reality for pain management

Medical terminology